October is a 2010 Peruvian black comedy-drama film directed by brothers Daniel Vega Vidal and Diego Vega Vidal. The film was screened in the Un Certain Regard section at the 2010 Cannes Film Festival. The film was selected as the Peruvian entry for the Best Foreign Language Film at the 84th Academy Awards, but it did not make the final shortlist.

Plot
The film tells the story of Clemente, a moneylender of few words, who might be a new hope for Sofía, his single neighbor. She is a devoted worshiper of Our Lord of the Miracles, a traditional religious image. They're brought together over a new-born baby, fruit of Clemente's relationship with a prostitute who's nowhere to be found. While Clemente is looking for the girl's mother, Sofía cares for the baby and looks after the moneylender's house. With the arrival of these beings in his life, Clemente has the opportunity to reconsider his emotional relations with people.

Cast
 Bruno Odar as Clemente
 Gabriela Velásquez as Sofía
 Carlos Gassols as Don Fico
 María Carbajal
 Víctor Prada
 Sofía Palacios
 Norma Francisca Villarreal
 Humberta Trujillo

See also
 List of submissions to the 84th Academy Awards for Best Foreign Language Film
 List of Peruvian submissions for the Academy Award for Best Foreign Language Film

References

External links
 

2010 films
2010s Spanish-language films
2010 comedy-drama films
2010s Peruvian films
Peruvian comedy-drama films
2010 black comedy films
Peruvian black comedy films